South Dakota Initiated Measure 27 was a 2022 voter initiative to legalize non-medical cannabis in the U.S. state of South Dakota. The initiative was certified by the South Dakota Secretary of State for the 2022 ballot on May 25, 2022. South Dakotans for Better Marijuana Laws (SDBML) organized the petition drive, and it was opposed by Protecting South Dakota Kids.

The initiative received a 52.92% no vote in the November 2022 election, and did not become law.

See also
Cannabis in South Dakota
List of 2022 United States cannabis reform proposals

References

External links
2022 ballot questions, South Dakota Secretary of State

2022 cannabis law reform
Cannabis in South Dakota
Proposed laws of the United States
Cannabis ballot measures in the United States
Measure 27
South Dakota Measure 27
South Dakota ballot measures